Bhairavsingh – Ek Rashtra sevak is a Bollywood film. It was released in 1940.

References

1940 films
1940s Hindi-language films